Jackson Township is an inactive township in Shelby County, in the U.S. state of Missouri.

Jackson Township was erected in the 1837, taking its name from President Andrew Jackson.

References

Townships in Missouri
Townships in Shelby County, Missouri